Ely is a surname which may refer to:

 Alfred Ely (1815–1892), American politician
 Arthur V. Ely (1912–1942), United States Navy officer and Navy Cross recipient
 Ben Ely (born 1970), Australian musician
 Bill Ely (1869–1957), Australian politician
 Bob Ely (born 1958), American entrepreneur, former investment banker and 2012 presidential candidate
 Dudley Ely (1817–1895), first mayor of South Norwalk, Connecticut
 Eugene Burton Ely (1886–1911), American aviation pioneer
 Frederick D. Ely (1838–1921), American politician
 Harold Ely (1909–1983), American football player
 Harry Ely, American football and baseball coach, mainly in the 1890s
 Harry Ely (baseball), American baseball player
 Helena Rutherfurd Ely (1858–1920), American author, amateur gardener and founding member of the Garden Club of America
 Jack Ely (1943–2015), American guitarist and singer, best known for singing the Kingsmen's version of "Louie Louie"
 Janet Ely (born 1953), American diver 
 John Hart Ely, American legal scholar 
 Joe Ely (born 1947), American singer, songwriter and guitarist
 John Ely (disambiguation)
 Joseph B. Ely (1881–1956), 52nd Governor of Massachusetts
 Melvin Ely (born 1978), American basketball player
 Michael Ely, author
 Nathaniel Ely (1605–1675), founding settler of Hartford and Norwalk, Connecticut
 Reginald Ely (fl. 1438-1471), English architect
 Richard T. Ely (1854–1943), American economist
 Rodrigo Ely (born 1993), Brazilian-Italian footballer
 Ron Ely (born 1938), stage name of American actor Ronald Pierce
 Shyra Ely (born 1983), American former Women's National Basketball Association player
 Smith Ely Jr. (1825–1911), New York City mayor and member of the United States House of Representatives
 Sumner Ely (1787–1857), New York politician
 Talfourd Ely (1838–1923), English archaeologist and classicist
 Theodore N. Ely (1846–1916), American businessman
 Thomas C. Ely, American bishop
 Victoria Joyce Ely (1889–1979), American nurse 
 William Ely (disambiguation)

See also
 Saint Ermenilda of Ely, daughter of King Eorcenberht of Kent and Saint Seaxburh of Ely.
 Nicholas of Ely,  Lord Chancellor of England, Bishop of Worcester, Bishop of Winchester, and Lord High Treasurer in the 13th century
 Saint Seaxburh of Ely, Anglo-Saxon princess, abbess and saint